Millionaire Gangsta is the 9th compilation album by American rapper Messy Marv, released on June 22, 2010. It includes guest appearances from E-40, Yukmouth and T-Nutty, among other artists. Millionaire Gangsta peaked at #90 on the R&B/Hip-Hop Albums chart and #8 on the Top Heatseekers Pacific chart.

Track listing

References

2010 albums
Messy Marv albums